Aliens: Colonial Marines Technical Manual, written by Lee Brimmicombe-Wood and published by HarperPrism is a guide to the fictional United States Colonial Marines depicted in the film Aliens. It describes the equipment of the Colonial Marines in great detail and contains expansive descriptions of the UD4L Cheyenne dropship and the 'Conestoga'-class spaceships (such as the Sulaco), both featured in the film.

The manual also contains information about the organization of the Colonial Marines, and while it attempts to stay faithful to the films it adds and expands upon a number of topics not depicted in the film, such as artillery and tanks. Often these are also commented on in-character by Colonial Marines. The manual ends with a series of transcripts between Weyland-Yutani employees as they discuss their theories on Xenomorphic Endoparasitoid biology and its possible exploitation. Many elements introduced in the book, especially weapons including the M83 SADAR, have since been featured in expanded universe Alien and Alien vs. Predator media, including comic books, novels, and video games.

Titan Books released a revised edition of the book on May 29, 2012, likely to promote the video game Aliens: Colonial Marines, a direct sequel to the second film.

Sources

External links
 PDF

1996 books
Alien (franchise) books